Dacalana anysis is a butterfly in the family Lycaenidae. It is found on the Indonesian islands of Sulawesi and Banggai.

The larvae feed on Scurrula species.

Subspecies
The following subspecies are recognised:
Dacalana anysis anysis (Sulawesi)
Dacalana anysis cervina (Röber, 1887) (Banggai)

References

Butterflies described in 1865
Dacalana
Butterflies of Indonesia
Taxa named by William Chapman Hewitson